Joseph or Joe Crone may refer to:

Joseph Crone, buried at Mount Hope Cemetery, Rochester
Joseph Crone, character in 11-11-11
Edward Crone, known as Joe, inspiration for Billy Pilgrim